Lieutenant General Marcus John Slade (22 January 1801 – 7 March 1872) was a British Army officer who became Lieutenant Governor of Guernsey.

Early life
Slade was the fourth son of General Sir John Slade, 1st Baronet (1762–1853) and the younger twin brother of Sir Frederic Slade, 2nd Baronet, who succeeded their father in the baronetcy. His youngest brother by his father's first wife was Admiral Sir Adolphus Slade.

Military career
Slade was commissioned into the 75th Regiment of Foot in 1819. He was appointed Commanding Officer of the 90th Light Infantry and commanded that Regiment throughout the 7th Xhosa War in 1846 and 1847.

He was appointed Lieutenant Governor of Guernsey in 1859 and was also Colonel of the 50th (Queen's Own) Regiment of Foot from 1862 to his death in 1872.

He lived at Elvington House in Ryde on the Isle of Wight and is buried in the Old Cemetery at Ryde.

Family
In 1842, he married Charlotte Ramsay, granddaughter of George Ramsay, 8th Earl of Dalhousie. They had two daughters and four sons:

Sir John Ramsay Slade   (16 March 1843 – 4 September 1913) 
Arthur Maitland Slade (27 November 1846 – 1847) died in childhood
Maj. Montagu Maule Slade (16 January 1849 – 29 February 1884), killed in action in the Second Battle of Teb while serving with the 10th Hussars. 
Lt.-Gen. Frederick George Slade  (15 December 1851 – 16 August 1910), Inspector-General of the Royal Garrison Artillery headquarters 1902–1906.
Fanny Maule Slade (1845 – 28 April 1875), married George Sackville Lane-Fox 
Helen Grace Slade (1854 – 7 April 1932), married Francis Robert Gregson

References

|-

1801 births
1872 deaths
British Army generals
Gordon Highlanders officers
Cameronians officers
English twins
Younger sons of baronets